Emison da Conceiçao (born 27 June 1985 in Recife, Brazil) is a Brazilian footballer who played for San Martín de San Juan of the Primera División in Argentina.

Teams
 Santa Cruz 2006-2008
 San Martín de San Juan 2008-2009
 Audax Italiano 2009-2010
 San Martín de San Juan 2010–present

External links
 Profile at BDFA

1985 births
Living people
Brazilian footballers
Brazilian expatriate footballers
Audax Italiano footballers
San Martín de San Juan footballers
Chilean Primera División players
Expatriate footballers in Chile
Expatriate footballers in Argentina
Association football forwards
Sportspeople from Recife